Eric Lux was one of the first 16-year-old drivers to finish the Rolex 24 Hours of Daytona, and the youngest winner in the Rolex Sports Car Series. Eric is an American businessman and race car driver. He continues to race part-time at a professional level in the IMSA WeatherTech Sportscar Championship. In 2022, Eric and teammates Pato O'Ward, Colton Herta, and Devlin DeFrancesco won the 60th Anniversary of the Rolex 24 Hours at Daytona in the Le Mans Prototype 2 category for DragonSpeed.

2005-2011 Rolex Sports Car Series.

2008-2008 NASCAR Camping World Series.

2010-2013 IMSA American Le Mans Series.

2013-2013 FIA World Endurance Championship.

2014-2014 IMSA WeatherTech SportsCar Championship.

2015-2015 SRO GT World Challenge Series.

2017-2019 SRO GT World Challenge Series.

2018-Present IMSA WeatherTech SportsCar Championship.

Motorsports Career 
•131 Professional Race Starts.

•1st Place Driver’s Championship - IMSA.

•Top-3 Driver’s Championship 2x - IMSA.

•Top-5 Driver’s Championships 2x - IMSA.

•Rookie of The Year - IMSA.

•Rolex 24 Hours at Daytona LMP2 IMSA Winner 2022.

•10 Wins in IMSA, WEC, ALMS, SRO & Rolex Sports Car Series.

•29 Podium finishes in IMSA, WEC, ALMS, SRO & Rolex Sports Car Series.

•52 Top-5 finishes in IMSA, WEC, ALMS, SRO & Rolex Sports Car Series.

•63 Top-10 finishes in IMSA, WEC, ALMS, SRO & Rolex Sports Car Series.

•24 Hours of Le Mans, 1 start, best result 10th.

•24 Hours of Daytona, 12 starts, best results 1st and 3rd.

•6 Hours of Watkins Glen, 8 starts, best results 1st and 3rd.

•10 Hours of Petit Le Mans, 4 starts, best result 2nd.

•12 Hours of Sebring, 4 starts, best results 3rd twice.

•12 Hours of Bathurst, 2 starts, best result 5th.

•6 Hours of Shanghai, 1 start, best result 5th.

•24 Hours of Dubai, 1 start, best result 5th.

•One of the first 16-year-old drivers to compete & finish the 24 Hours of Daytona.

•Youngest Grand-Am Cup GS Winner during 2006 Daytona 200.

•Has raced over 50 different GT, prototype and stockcars since 2004.

•Has raced with over 30 different racing teams since 2004.

•Youngest licensed racing driver in the United States in 2003 at 14 years old.

•Multiple regional and national karting championships and wins including in the World Karting Association.

NASCAR 
(key) (Bold – Pole position awarded by qualifying time. Italics – Pole position earned by points standings or practice time. * – Most laps led.)

NASCAR Camping World Series

WeatherTech SportsCar Championship Results 

* Season still in progress.

24 Hours of Daytona results

24 Hours of Le Mans Result

References

1988 births
American Le Mans Series drivers
Living people
24 Hours of Daytona drivers
Rolex Sports Car Series drivers
24 Hours of Le Mans drivers
FIA World Endurance Championship drivers
WeatherTech SportsCar Championship drivers
Starworks Motorsport drivers
Greaves Motorsport drivers
DragonSpeed drivers
Aston Martin Racing drivers
Conquest Racing drivers
United Autosports drivers
Michelin Pilot Challenge drivers